Kuwait hosted and competed in the 2nd West Asian Games held in Kuwait City from April 3, 2002 to April 12, 2002. Kuwait ranked 1st with 31 gold medals in this edition of the West Asian Games.

References

West Asian Games
Nations at the 2002 West Asian Games

Kuwait at the West Asian Games